The Savo-Karelia constituency (Finnish: Savo-Karjalan vaalipiiri, Swedish: Savolax-Karelens valkrets) is a Finnish constituency represented in eduskunta. It covers the regions of North Karelia and Northern Savonia. The Savo-Karelia district currently elects 16 members of the Eduskunta. The district was formed in 2013 by merging the electoral districts of Northern Savonia and North Karelia into one.

Members of parliament

2015–2019
Markku Eestilä (NCP)
Sari Essayah (CD)
Hannakaisa Heikkinen (Centre)
Hannu Hoskonen (Centre)
Elsi Katainen (Centre)
Kimmo Kivelä (Finns)
Kari Kulmala (Finns)
Seppo Kääriäinen (Centre)
Krista Mikkonen (Greens)
Riitta Myller (SDP)
Merja Mäkisalo-Ropponen (SDP)
Pentti Oinonen (Finns)
Sari Raassina (NCP)
Markku Rossi (Centre)
Matti Semi (Left)
Anu Vehviläinen (Centre)

2019–2023
Sanna Antikainen (Finns)
Markku Eestilä (NCP)
Seppo Eskelinen (SDP)
Sari Essayah (CD)
Hannakaisa Heikkinen (Centre)
Hannu Hoskonen (Centre)
Hanna Huttunen (Centre)
Marko Kilpi (NCP)
Krista Mikkonen (Greens)
Merja Mäkisalo-Ropponen (SDP)
Minna Reijonen (Finns)
Matti Semi (Left)
Anu Vehviläinen (Centre)
Tuula Väätäinen (SDP)
Jussi Wihonen (Finns)

References

See also
 Constituencies of Finland

Parliament of Finland electoral districts
North Karelia
North Savo